Pterotolithus maculatus, commonly known as the blotched tiger-toothed croaker, is a marine fish native to the Indian Ocean.

References

Fish of the Indian Ocean
Fish described in 1830
Taxa named by Georges Cuvier
Sciaenidae